Valley Flyer may refer to:

 Valley Flyer, a former passenger train in California, United States.
 Valley Flyer (bus company), a defunct bus company in New Zealand
 Valley Flyer (Amtrak train), an Amtrak passenger train in New England